Schimberg is a municipality in the district of Eichsfeld in Thuringia, Germany.

Personalities 
 Josef Rodenstock (1846-1932), optician and founder of the optical works named after him

References

Eichsfeld (district)